Kåre Rønnes (born 13 January 1938 in Trondheim) is a Norwegian former football player and coach. He played all his career in Rosenborg BK, Trondheim.

Biography
Kåre Rønnes played for his hometown team Rosenborg 19 seasons in a row from 1956 to 1974, a record shared with Ola By Rise. (Roar Strand has also played 19 seasons for the club, but not in a row.) Rønnes played in all positions on the field, including goalkeeper, but mostly midfielder in the first part of his career, and defender in the later part. As young as 22 he became captain of the team.

No accurate statistics exist on the number of matches Rønnes played, but it is estimated to 700. Totally in the seasons 1961–1962 and 1967–1974 while Rosenborg played in the Norwegian top division, Rønnes played 178 matches and scored 17 goals.

Rønnes was capped once for Norway U-21 national team. 

Rønnes was manager of Rosenborg BK in the 1975 season, coaching the team to fourth position, equal in points with runner-up Brann and Start in the third position. Rønnes continued his managerial career in Strindheim IL in the 1976 and 1977 seasons, coaching Strindheim from the third to the second level in Norwegian football.

Honours

Club
Rosenborg BK
Norwegian Premier League Champion: 1967, 1969, 1971,
Norwegian Premier League Runner up: 1968, 1970, 1973
Norwegian Cup Win: 1960, 1964, 1971
Norwegian Cup Runner up: 1967, 1972, 1973

Individual
Rønnes is appointed honorary member of Rosenborg BK.

External links

References

1938 births
Living people
Norwegian football managers
Norwegian footballers
Footballers from Trondheim
Rosenborg BK managers
Rosenborg BK players
Eliteserien players
Association football defenders 
Association football midfielders